Jean-Pierre Amat (born 13 June 1962 in Chambéry, Savoie) is a French sport shooter who competed and won a gold medal at the 1996 Summer Olympics in the small bore rifle, three positions event.

Current world record in 50 m rifle prone

References

1962 births
Living people
Sportspeople from Chambéry
French male sport shooters
ISSF rifle shooters
Shooters at the 1984 Summer Olympics
Shooters at the 1988 Summer Olympics
Shooters at the 1992 Summer Olympics
Shooters at the 1996 Summer Olympics
Shooters at the 2000 Summer Olympics
Olympic shooters of France
Olympic gold medalists for France
Olympic bronze medalists for France
Olympic medalists in shooting
Medalists at the 1996 Summer Olympics
20th-century French people